Al Qoubaiyat, Koubeiyat, Kobayat or Qoubayat is the biggest Christian village in the Akkar Governorate, Lebanon. Its population is mostly composed of Maronites numbering around 12,000 persons according to the civil state registers. It is usually full with people during summer but a few stay during the winter. The village's mountainous terrain and snowy winters harbour many leisure activities including hiking, camping, mountain biking, offroading and sightseeing. During the winter, many locals and tourists head towards its high peaks for skiing.

Etymology
The origin of the name "Al Qoubaiyat" is Aramaic. The word "Qbayya" means the big pool of water, and "Qbayyat" is the plural of it. That region was called "Qbayyat" for being rich in water sources.

Geography
Al Qoubaiyat is located at the northeast of the Lebanese republic.  to the North of the Lebanese capital Beirut. It covers around 70 sqm.

It is bordered at the west by Akkar al-Atika and Bireh, at the East by Hermel, and the north by Andaket and Aydamoun.

History
During the 17th century the name of Al Qoubaiyat began to appear in the documents of the legislative court in Tripoli as being the biggest village in Akkar paying the taxes of engagement.
It was known as the "fertile valley" throughout its history; it has been a center of attraction for people desiring stability based on agriculture, and accordingly, civilization took shape.
In 1838, Eli Smith noted  el-Kubeiyat''  as a Maronite village, located east of esh-Sheikh Muhammed.

One of the French delegates in Lebanon "Ducousso" depicted it in 1912 by the taking after words: "These valleys are interesting by their shocking richness". Usually how Qoubaiyat has been for a long time the home of a few people groups. Its ruins are the witness of its local individuals, with cemeteries from the age of press and copper dating back to 3000 a long time BC 
It is located on the silk road, between East and West Asia through the Mediterranean, towards Rome, the capital of the ancient world. There is a Phoenician and pagan altar in front of St. Chahlo church. Phoenician, Greek and Roman pieces of currency were found at Saydet al Ghassalet church and St. Chahlo, in addition to Roman tombs spread across the town, as well as two notable Roman ruins that are all witnesses of the great prosperity in the Roman age during the first centuries of Christianity: The first was the temple of the God Ban, in the Helsban Valley, which its ruins were rebuilt into a monastery under the name of St. Artimos-Challita'''. The second ruin is located to the south-west, currently known as Saint Georges chapel, which witnessed the events of the Umayyad-Byzantine duel in the Middle East. A third witness, is the convent of Mar Doumit of the Carmelite Fathers on the hill; considerable thanks to its vast place, to its subsisting bases and to the found jars.

Economy and services

Educational Institutions: 
Public
A kindergarten, an elementary and intermediate, a high school, a teachers college and a public training school which is still under construction.
Private
A kindergarten, an elementary and intermediate school for the Carmelite Fathers (Ecole Mar Doumit des Pères Carmes), a kindergarten and an elementary school for the Sisters of Charity (ND Paix), a private training school and a nursery school belonging to the hospital of Sayidat Al Salam of the antonine Maronite sisters. 
Civil Institutions: 
An agricultural cooperative, three groups of the Scouts Of Lebanon, two groups of the Guides Of Lebanon, an environment council, Caritas center and a public library established by the municipality. 
Private medical institutions: 
The hospital of Sayidat Al Salam, for the Sisters of Saint Anthony, the dispensary of Malta's knights, many Pharmacies and various clinics specialized in all medical fields. 
Agriculture: 
The cultivation of mulberry was prosperous in Kobayat. But it disappeared and the mulberry was replaced by fruitful trees (vine, apple, pear, cherry and especially olive trees.). Then appeared the cultivation of tobacco, vegetables and grains. There are also several poultry farms, few flocks of sheep and goats and some fisheries.

References

Bibliography

External links
 Kobayat News section in Sada Akkar, a local online news agency
 http://www.kobayat.org/

Populated places in Akkar District
Maronite Christian communities in Lebanon